Joe Joyce vs Zhilei Zhang is an upcoming heavyweight boxing match contested between Joe Joyce and Zhilei Zhang.

The bout will be held at the Copper Box Arena in the Queen Elizabeth Olympic Park, in London, England. The WBO interim heavyweight title will be at stake.

Background
Joe Joyce won the WBO Interim World Heavyweight title in a September 2022 bout against Joseph Parker. Zhang's last bout was in August 2022 when he suffered his first loss to Croatian Filip Hrgović. Meanwhile, the WBO heavyweight champion Oleksandr Usyk's next fight is expected to be against WBC champion Tyson Fury at some point in 2023.

Fight card
Source:

References

2023 in boxing
2023 in British sport
April 2023 sports events in the United Kingdom
2023 sports events in London
International sports competitions in London
Pay-per-view boxing matches